Obsequiae is an American medieval metal band formed in 2007 in Minneapolis, Minnesota. The current line-up of the band consists of Tanner Anderson (vocals, guitar, bass), Vicente La Camera Mariño (harp) and Andrew Della Cagna (drums). The band's debut album, Obsequiae’s Suspended in the Brume of Eos, was released in 2011. Its 2015 follow-up, Aria of Vernal Tombs, received positive reviews from music outlets such as Pitchfork, Spin and Decibel.

The band's music has been described as "castle metal" a "mishmash of medieval music and melodic black metal," with additional influences from doom metal and death metal.

Members
Current members
 Tanner Anderson – vocals, guitar, bass (2007–present)
 Vicente La Camera Mariño – harp
 Andrew Della Cagna – drums (2011–present)
 Eoghan McCloskey - drums (2019-present)

Former members
 Neidhart von Reuental – drums, bass

Live members
 Andy Klockow – bass (2015–present)
 Timothy Glenn – drums (2015–2018)
 Eoghan McCloskey - drums (2019-present)
 Carl Skildum – guitar (2015–present)
 Brandon Almendinger – vocals (2015–present)
 Gautier d'Espinal – guitar (2009-2010)

Discography
Studio albums
 Suspended in the Brume of Eos (2011)
 Aria of Vernal Tombs (2015)
 The Palms of Sorrowed Kings (2019)

Demos
 Obsequiae (2009)

References

External links
 

Musical groups established in 2007
American musical trios
American black metal musical groups
American folk metal musical groups
Medieval metal musical groups
Heavy metal musical groups from Minnesota